Anna Weamys, sometimes referred to as Anne Weamys (fl. 1651) was an English author.  Weamys has been identified as the author of A Continuation of Sir Philip Sydney's Arcadia (1651), which appeared under the name "Mistress A. W."   Little is known of her life, but Patrick Cullen situates her in the context of a network of royalist sympathizers,  including aristocratic patron Henry Pierrepont and his daughters Anne and Grace, writer James Howell, printer William Bentley, bookseller Thomas Heath, and possibly poet Frances Vaughan (née Altham).  A modern (1994) edition of Weamys' book was edited by Patrick Cullen.

References

17th-century English writers
17th-century English women writers
Women writers (Renaissance)
Renaissance writers
Year of birth unknown
Year of death unknown